Małe Ciche , is a village and a ski resort, in the administrative district of Gmina Poronin, within Tatra County, Lesser Poland Voivodeship, in southern Poland.

The village has a population of 400.

See also

 Podhale

References

Villages in Tatra County
Ski areas and resorts in Poland